Arthur Macalister,  (18 January 1818 – 23 March 1883) was three times Premier of Queensland, Australia.

Early life
Macalister was born in Glasgow, Scotland, son of John Macalister, a cabinet maker, and his wife Mary, née Scoullar. Macalister was educated in Glasgow and emigrated to Australia with his wife Elizabeth Wallace née Tassie. They arrived in Sydney on 28 September 1839 on the Abbotsford.

Macalister was appointed to the positions of clerk of Petty Sessions and postmaster at Scone, New South Wales in June 1840. In 1846 he was working for a solicitor in Sydney. In 1850 he was admitted as a solicitor and attorney.

Political career
Macalister then settled in the Moreton Bay district, then part of New South Wales. Macalister took part in the movement for separation, and was elected a representative for Ipswich in the New South Wales parliament on 14 June 1859.

In 1859, the colony of Queensland was separated from New South Wales and Macalister was elected to the first parliament as member for his old district and was made chairman of committees. In March 1862 he joined the Herbert ministry as Secretary for Public Lands and Works, and when Herbert resigned on 1 February 1866, became Premier.

Macalister's ministry only lasted until 20 July 1866, when he resigned owing to the Governor, Sir George Bowen, refusing to sanction a proposed issue of "inconvertible government notes". Bowen called on Herbert to form a new ministry which immediately carried an act authorizing the issue of exchequer bills. This carried the colony through a financial crisis caused by the failure of the Agra and Masterman's Bank, which had arranged a loan for railway extensions.

Herbert had to leave for England almost at once, a reconstruction of the ministry was made, and Macalister again became Premier on 7 August 1866. He resigned a year later and was again elected Chairman of Committees.  When Charles Lilley became Premier in November 1868, Macalister took office as Secretary for Public Lands and Works, and for the goldfields. This ministry resigned in May 1870 and, in November, Macalister was elected Speaker. Macalister lost his seat after a hectic campaign in June 1871 but was re-elected for Ipswich in 1872 in a by-election. Macalister formed his third ministry in January 1874 and resigned in June 1876 to become Agent-General for Queensland in London.

Later life
Macalister's health was failing in 1881 and he resigned his office as Agent-General; he was granted a pension of £500 a year by the Queensland parliament. He was created Companion of the Order of St Michael and St George in 1876.

Macalister died near Glasgow on 23 March 1883 at the age of 65. He was survived by his wife, who died 14 September 1894.

Family
Macalister married Elizabeth Wallace Tassie in Edinburgh, Scotland with whom he had 9 children.

Legacy
A number of street names in the Brisbane suburb of Carina Heights are identical to the surnames of former Members of the Queensland Legislative Assembly. One of these is Macalister Street.

The electoral district of Macalister created in the 2017 Queensland state electoral redistribution was named after him.

The Macalister Range along the Far North Queensland coast between Cairns and Port Douglas was named in honour of the Premier by George Augustus Frederick Elphinstone Dalrymple during the 1873 ‘Queensland North East Coast Expedition’.

See also
 Members of the Queensland Legislative Assembly, 1860–1863; 1863–1867; 1867–1868; 1868–1870; 1870–1871; 1871–1873; 1873–1878

References

External links

 

1818 births
1883 deaths
Premiers of Queensland
Australian Companions of the Order of St Michael and St George
Members of the New South Wales Legislative Assembly
Scottish emigrants to colonial Australia
Lawyers from Glasgow
Speakers of the Queensland Legislative Assembly
19th-century Australian politicians
Members of the Queensland Legislative Assembly